The Hellenic Institute of Byzantine and Post-Byzantine Studies in Venice is a research centre owned and funded by the Greek state in Venice, Italy, focusing on Byzantine and Post-Byzantine/Modern Greek studies. It is the only Greek research institute abroad.

The institute was founded in 1951, and operates under the auspices of the Greek Ministry of Foreign Affairs, with its educational activity coordinated by the Greek Ministry of Education. The Institute owns several buildings associated with the formerly vibrant Greek community of Venice, most notably the church of San Giorgio dei Greci and the Flanginian School. It also operates its own museum and archive, which house a collection of 300 icons and numerous manuscripts, most notably a copy of the Romance of Alexander the Great.

See also
Hellenic Institute of Byzantine and Post-Byzantine Catalog of Paintings

References

Bibliography

External links 
 Homepage

1951 establishments in Greece
1951 establishments in Italy
Buildings and structures in Castello, Venice
Greece–Italy relations
Research institutes in Italy
Research institutes established in 1951
Organisations based in Venice
Education in Venice
Museums in Venice
Byzantine studies
Modern Greek studies